The Streamer Awards is an awards show dedicated to live streamers. It was founded in 2022 by Twitch streamer QTCinderella.

History
The event has been held twice since its inaugural ceremony in March 2022.

2022

The first edition was held on March 12, 2022, at The Fonda Theatre in Los Angeles and was broadcast live on Twitch. The event peaked at 381,436 concurrent viewers, making it the 45th highest concurrent viewership for a single broadcast in Twitch history. Event founder QTCinderella hosted the award ceremony, along with Maya Higa.

For the inaugural ceremony, nominees were selected via an online vote by fans. Winners were then determined using a weighted combination of the online popular vote (70%) and panelist vote (30%). The categories "Best Political Streamer" and "Best Sports Game Streamer" were removed during the nomination process due to a lack of votes. 

Winners are listed first and in boldface.

2023

The second edition of the awards took place on March 11, 2023 at The Wiltern in Los Angeles. Streamers were nominated by their fans. For the nominations to be considered, the streamers must have had at least 200 total hours streamed in 2022. This was followed by a popular vote among the nominated streamers to decide the winner. The event was hosted by QTCinderella and Valkyrae. Viewership between the main broadcast and co-streams peaked at 580,159 concurrent viewers. 

For this edition, four new categories were added (Best Soulslike Streamer, Best Art Streamer, Hidden Gem Award, and Streamer's Streamer Award), and three categories were removed (Best Super Smash Bros. Streamer, Best ASMR Streamer, and Best GTA RP Streamer). The Streamer's Streamer award was voted on by streamers attending the show. The Legacy Award, previously part of the public vote, was instead chosen by a panel. 

Winners are listed first and in boldface.

List of ceremonies

References

Awards established in 2022
Events in Los Angeles
Web awards
Twitch (service)
Livestreams